Claudiu Gabriel Dumitrescu (born 7 October 1979) is a Romanian former footballer who played as a full back. Dumitrescu grew up at Poiana Câmpina for which he also made his Liga II and Liga III debuts. In career he played mostly for Otopeni (147 matches; 8 goals), but spent also short periods at Petrolul Ploiești and Concordia Chiajna. In the last two seasons of his career, Dumitrescu played in 55 matches and scored 5 goals for FC Gloria Buzău. He made the Liga I debut also for Otopeni, in a 0–4 defeat against CFR Cluj on 20 September 2008.

External links
 
 
 

1979 births
Living people
People from Câmpina
Romanian footballers
Association football defenders
Liga I players
CS Otopeni players
CS Concordia Chiajna players
Liga II players
FCM Câmpina players
FC Petrolul Ploiești players
FC Gloria Buzău players